Kordax may refer to:

 Kordax (dance)
 Kordax (Aquaman)